The 2021 Hylo Open was a badminton tournament which took place at the Saarlandhalle in Saarbrücken, Germany, from 2 to 7 November 2021 with a total prize of US$320,000.

In 2021, the tournament changed its name from SaarLorLux Open to Hylo Open and was upgraded from a Super 100 tournament to a Super 500.

Tournament
The 2021 Hylo Open was the seventh tournament as the only planned Super 500 tournament of the 2021 BWF World Tour as many tournaments got canceled due to the COVID-19 pandemic. It was a part of the Hylo Open, which had been held since 1988. The tournament was organized by the local organizer with sanction from the BWF.

Venue
This international tournament was held at Saarlandhalle in Saarbrücken, Germany.

Point distribution 
Below is the point distribution table for each phase of the tournament based on the BWF points system for the BWF World Tour Super 500 event.

Prize money 
The total prize money for this tournament was US$320,000. The distribution of the prize money was in accordance with BWF regulations.

Men's singles

Seeds 

 Chou Tien-chen (first round)
 Lee Zii Jia (final)
 Ng Ka Long (quarter-finals)
 Wang Tzu-wei (second round)
 Rasmus Gemke (quarter-finals)
 Srikanth Kidambi (semi-finals)
 Lee Cheuk Yiu (second round)
 Kantaphon Wangcharoen (quarter-finals)

Finals

Top half

Section 1

Section 2

Bottom half

Section 3

Section 4

Women's singles

Seeds 

 Ratchanok Intanon (second round)
 Pornpawee Chochuwong (second round)
 Michelle Li (semi-finals)
 Mia Blichfeldt (withdrew)
 Busanan Ongbamrungphan (champion)
 Gregoria Mariska Tunjung (second round)
 Yvonne Li (first round)
 Kirsty Gilmour (first round)

Finals

Top half

Section 1

Section 2

Bottom half

Section 3

Section 4

Men's doubles

Seeds 

 Marcus Fernaldi Gideon / Kevin Sanjaya Sukamuljo (champions)
 Mohammad Ahsan / Hendra Setiawan (quarter-finals)
 Fajar Alfian / Muhammad Rian Ardianto (quarter-finals)
 Kim Astrup / Anders Skaarup Rasmussen (withdrew)
 Ong Yew Sin / Teo Ee Yi (first round)
 Ben Lane / Sean Vendy (quarter-finals)
 Mark Lamsfuß / Marvin Seidel (first round)
 Yang Po-han / Lu Ching-yao (second round)

Finals

Top half

Section 1

Section 2

Bottom half

Section 3

Section 4

Women's doubles

Seeds 

 Jongkolphan Kititharakul / Rawinda Prajongjai (semi-finals)
 Gabriela Stoeva / Stefani Stoeva (first round)
 Chloe Birch / Lauren Smith (first round)
 Maiken Fruergaard / Sara Thygesen (first round)
 Puttita Supajirakul / Sapsiree Taerattanachai (quarter-finals)
 Amalie Magelund / Freja Ravn (withdrew)
 Ashwini Ponnappa / N. Sikki Reddy (second round)
 Hsu Ya-ching / Hu Ling-fang (first round)

Finals

Top half

Section 1

Section 2

Bottom half

Section 3

Section 4

Mixed doubles

Seeds 

 Dechapol Puavaranukroh / Sapsiree Taerattanachai (champions)
 Praveen Jordan / Melati Daeva Oktavianti (final)
 Marcus Ellis / Lauren Smith (second round)
 Chan Peng Soon / Goh Liu Ying (first round)
 Hafiz Faizal / Gloria Emanuelle Widjaja (quarter-finals)
 Thom Gicquel / Delphine Delrue (withdrew)
 Tang Chun Man / Tse Ying Suet (first round)
 Tan Kian Meng / Lai Pei Jing (first round)

Finals

Top half

Section 1

Section 2

Bottom half

Section 3

Section 4

References

External links
 Tournament Link

Hylo Open
Hylo Open
Hylo Open
Hylo Open